Eutermina is a genus of moths of the family Erebidae. The genus was erected by George Hampson in 1926.

Species
Eutermina apicirupta Carcasson, 1965
Eutermina tenebrosa Holland, 1894

References

Calpinae